Liolaemus pseudolemniscatus is a species of lizard in the family Iguanidae. It is endemic to Chile, with occurrence noted in the Chilean matorral.

References

 C. Michael Hogan & World Wildlife Fund. 2013. Chilean matorral. ed. M.McGinley. Encyclopedia of Earth. National Council for Science and the Environment. Washington DC
 Catalogue of Life. 2013. Liolaemus pseudolemniscatus Downloaded on 29 Nov 2013. 
 The Reptile Database: Liolaemus pseudolemniscatus

pseudolemniscatus
Lizards of South America
Endemic fauna of Chile
Reptiles of Chile
Chilean Matorral
Reptiles described in 1990